The Fifth Season is a live album of Polish progressive rock group Quidam, released 2009. It was recorded at Teatr Śląski im. Stanisława Wyspiańskiego, Katowice, November 15, 2005.

Track listing 
 "Hands Off" (Florek, Kossowicz, Meller, Wróblewski, Ziólkowski) – 9:24
 "Queen of Moulin Rouge" (Florek, Kossowicz, Meller, Wróblewski, Ziólkowski) – 8:27
 "Surrevival" (Florek, Kossowicz, Meller, Wróblewski, Ziólkowski) – 5:58
 "Sanktuarium" (Derkowska, Florek, Meller, Szaserski) – 7:44
 "Oldies But Goldies: List Z Pustyni I/Pod Powieka/Plone/Wesola/Jest Taki Samotny Dom/Niespelnienie/Gleboka Rzeka" (Derkowska, Florek, Jermakow, Lipko, Meller, Scholl, Szadkowski) – 9:43
 "The Fifth Season" (Florek, Kossowicz, Meller, Wróblewski, Ziólkowski) – 10:34
 "Everything's Ended" (Florek, Kossowicz, Meller, Wróblewski, Ziólkowski) – 11:44
 "Not So Close" (Florek, Kossowicz, Meller, Wróblewski, Ziólkowski) – 10:05

Personnel 
 Zbyszek Florek – keyboards
 Maciek Meller – guitars
 Bartek Kossowicz – vocals, backing vocals
 Mariusz Ziółkowski – bass guitar
 Maciek Wróblewski – drums
 Jacek Zasada – flutes
 Lukasz Bukowski – photography
 Adam Kozlowski – photography

References

Quidam (band) live albums
2009 live albums
2009 video albums
Live video albums
Metal Mind Productions video albums